Oxuderces is a genus of fish in the family Gobiidae native to fresh and brackish waters of coasts of the Indian and Pacific Ocean.

Species
These are the recognized species in this genus:
 Oxuderces dentatus Eydoux & Souleyet, 1848
 Oxuderces nexipinnis (Cantor, 1849) 
 Oxuderces wirzi (Koumans, 1937) (Wirz's goby)

References

Oxudercinae
Taxa named by Joseph Fortuné Théodore Eydoux
Taxa named by Louis François Auguste Souleyet